Apostolos Toskas (born 28 December 1947) is a Greek former professional footballer who played as defender.

Club career
Toskas began his football career at the age of just 18 at Trikala, where he played until 1969. He moved to Athens to sign for AEK Athens, where he spent most of his career. The manager of the club at the time, Branko Stanković had a lot of faith in him and immediately established him in the starting eleven. Very quickly he was became an international and one of the club's key players in the defense. The most important moment of his career was his participation to the semi-finals of the UEFA Cup in the 1977. In the decade he played for AEK, he won 3 Championships, a Greek Cup including a domestic double in 1978. In the summer of 1980, at the age of 33, Toskas moved to Atromitos where he spent 2 seasons, ending his professional career. He continued an amateur level playing for Triglia Rafinas as a player-coach for several years, until the summer of 1986.

International career
Toskas was a member Greece U21, which in 1969 won the 2nd Balkan Youth Championship.

Toskas made his debut for Greece on 19 July 1969 in an away friendly 1–0 defeat against Australia, under the guidance of Dan Georgiadis. In total he participated in 20 matches between 1969 and 1973.

Personal life
Toskas is an integral member of the veterans association of AEK.

His son, Grigoris was also a footballer who played at AEK Athens from 2000 to 2005.

Honours

Trikala
Beta Ethniki: 1967–68 (North Group)

AEK Athens
Alpha Ethniki: 1970–71, 1977–78, 1978–79
Greek Cup: 1977–78

Atromitos
Beta Ethniki: 1979–80 (South Group)

Greece U21
Balkan Youth Championship: 1969

References

1947 births
Living people
Greek footballers
Greece international footballers
Super League Greece players
Association football defenders
Trikala F.C. players
AEK Athens F.C. players
Atromitos F.C. players
Footballers from Trikala